Exercise Zapad ('Exercise West') is a series of Soviet Union and Russian Federation military exercises, including:

Exercise Zapad-81
Zapad 1999 exercise
Zapad 2009 exercise
Zapad 2017 exercise
Zapad 2021
Zapad 2023

References

 
Military exercises and wargames
Belarusian military exercises
Zapad